Zabrus tenuestriatus is a species of ground beetle in the Pelor subgenus that can be found in Algeria and Tunisia.

References

Beetles described in 1859
Beetles of North Africa
Zabrus